Narodnoye is a rural locality (a selo) and the administrative center of Narodnenskoye Rural Settlement, Ternovsky District, Voronezh Oblast, Russia. The population was 1,153 as of 2010. There are 19 streets.

Geography 
Narodnoye is located on the Sukhoy Karachan River, 25 km southeast of Ternovka (the district's administrative centre) by road. Popovka is the nearest rural locality.

References 

Rural localities in Ternovsky District